Bluit is a ghost town in southern Roosevelt County, in the southeastern part of the U.S. state of New Mexico. The village is located about 12 miles east of Milnesand, New Mexico, on NM 262. There are few remains of the community now standing, as the site is long abandoned.

Geography of Roosevelt County, New Mexico
Ghost towns in New Mexico
History of Roosevelt County, New Mexico